Benjamin Alfred Onyango Ochieng, is a Kenyan-American actor, particularly active in Hollywood film industry. He is best known for the roles in the films Tears of the Sun, God's Not Dead and Beautifully Broken.

Personal life
He was born in Ofafa Jericho Estate in Eastlands, Nairobi, Kenya, as the second child in a family of seven brothers. His father was Christopher Ochieng and mother was Eudiah Achieng Ochieng. Benjamin started his primary education in Ofafa Jericho Primary School then Ofafa Jericho Secondary School. When Benjamin turned 18, he was hired by his dad at British American Tobacco Kenya Ltd (BAT) and later he was moved to a clerk position in the Wages Department where he worked for 4 years. Then he was transferred to computer department and worked for two years. 

He later joined United States International University (USIU) to study Management Information Systems (MIT). For further studies, Benjamin moved to the USIU, San Diego in the USA. From there, he was transferred to California State University, Stanislaus in Turlock, California. Then in 1992, he graduated with a Bachelor of Science Degree in Computer Science.

Career
After graduation, he relocated to Hollywood, California, where he further studied music and acting. He worked with Funk Rock band 'P.F.O.' for few years  later decided to be a professional actor. With this thought, he started to appear in many feature films and popular American television serials such as  General Hospital, The Shield and The X-files in 1999. Meanwhile, he starred in The God’s Not Dead Trilogy franchise as well as Tears of the Sun, Heavenly Deposit, Beautifully Broken, Father Africa, The Boy, Road to Redemption, Default, Kwame, Chains, Thunder Chance, The Disciple, American Crude and The Terminal.

He also became a voice actor and rendered his voice to the films and television serials including; Last Face, Furious 7, Constantine, Night At the Museum I & III, Machine Gun Preacher, Inception, The Day the Earth Stood Still, Primeval, League of Extraordinary Gentlemen, The Path to 911, Mighty Joe Young and E-ring.

Apart from acting, he is also a writer with popular writing credits include: The Wives (TV Series); Dysfunctionally Organized (Web Series); Mind Tricks and Curse of Devil’s Mountain (Shorts), Cheza and Original Man (Films).

Filmography

See also
 List of Black Sails characters

References

External links
 

Living people
1961 births
Kenyan male film actors
People from Nairobi
Kenyan emigrants to the United States
Kenyan male television actors
21st-century Kenyan male actors
California State University, Stanislaus alumni
United States International University Africa